Andrés Conesa Labastida (born June 15, 1969) is the CEO of Mexican airline Aeroméxico.

Conesa was appointed CEO of Grupo Aeromexico in 2005. He is a member of the Board of Governors of the International Air Transport Association (IATA) since 2008 and was appointed as Chairman of the Board starting June 2015, becoming the first Mexican to hold this position. In 2013, he was elected to Chair the Executive Committee of the ALTA (Latin American and Caribbean Air Transport Association). Mr. Conesa also chaired the Directive Council of the National Chamber of Aviation (CANAERO) in Mexico during 2013.

Andrés Conesa has a degree in Economy from the Autonomous Technological Institute of Mexico (ITAM) in Mexico City and a Ph.D. in Economy by the MIT. He was awarded Fulbright and Ford MacArthur Fellowships for his postgraduate studies abroad, and the National
Economics Prize in Mexico in 1997.

Mr. Conesa is married to the Mexican golf star Lorena Ochoa, who announced her retirement from the sport in 2010 in order to start their family.

Positions held 
Source:

Mexican Public Administration 
 Advisor to the Secretary of Finance and Public Credit from 1990 to 1991
 Advisor to the Secretary of the Economic Cabinet of the Presidency from 1991 to 1993
 Chief Advisor to the Undersecretary of Finance and Public Credit from 1997 to 1998
 Director General for International Financial Affairs in the Ministry of Finance from 1998 to 2000

Dr. Conesa Labastida served as:
 Director General of Economic Policy at the Ministry of Finance from 2000 to 2003
 Deputy Undersecretary for Public Credit from August 2003 to December 2004

Aeromexico and Cintra 
He has served as:
 Director of Grupo Aeromexico SAB de CV since 2005
 Chairman of Consorcio Aeromexico S.A. de C.V. (formerly, Cintra Sa De Cv) starting in September, 2004

Boards of Directors 
 Mexican Stock Exchange, in 2007
 Genomma Lab Internacional, since 2012
 IEnova, since 2013

Degrees and awards 
He obtained the Fulbright and Ford MacArthur scholarships, and in 1997 he was awarded with the Banamex National Prize in Economic Research. Dr. Conesa Labastida holds a BA in Economics from the Instituto Autonomo de Mexico (ITAM) in Mexico City and a PhD in Economics at the Massachusetts Institute of Technology.

 President of the Directive Council of the National Chamber of Aviation (CANAERO)
 Good Neighbor Award by the Bi-national Board of the United States-Mexico Chamber of Commerce.
 Federico Bloch Award from the Latin American and Caribbean Air Transport Association (ALTA)

References 

Living people
1960 births
Businesspeople from Mexico City
MIT School of Humanities, Arts, and Social Sciences alumni
Businesspeople in aviation
Tax officials
Mexican economists
Aeroméxico
Conesa, Andrés